Acacia perangusta, commonly known as eprapah wattle, is a tree or shrub belonging to the genus Acacia and the subgenus Phyllodineae native to eastern Australia.

Description
It has slender, glabrous, reddish brown coloured branchlets that are angled at the extremities. Like most species of Acacia it has phyllodes rather than true leaves. They are occasionally obtuse-mucronate and have a fine midrib fine with few obscure lateral nerves. After flowering glabrous seed pods form that are covered in white powdery coating.

Distribution

See also
 List of Acacia species

References

perangusta
Flora of Queensland
Plants described in 1980